American Frontiers: A Public Lands Journey was a non-profit publicity project intended to raise awareness about public lands in the United States.  It involved teams of travellers making their way across the United States, from Mexico to Canada,  while avoiding private estates.

Background
Nearly one-third of the United States belongs to US citizens in the form of public lands. As the nation's urban and suburban populations expand, public lands and open spaces become ever more important. In spite of the importance of public lands, they are unknown to millions of Americans.

In 2002 the nonprofit Public Lands Interpretive Association (PLIA) partnered with the National Geographic Society, federal and state land management agencies, private businesses and other organizations in an attempt to focus national attention on American public estate by highlighting the experiences of two groups of travelers who followed a route from Mexico to Canada, which stayed on public lands the entire way "the first ever made entirely on public lands".  This journey, known as American Frontiers, A Public Lands Journey, aimed to create a broad national exposure about the role and relevancy of public lands.

The Trek
On July 31, 2002 two teams of travelers started simultaneously from the Mexican and the Canadian borders in New Mexico and Montana. During the following two months they traversed more than 2600 miles and crossed six states, entirely on public lands.

The trek set out to show ways people enjoy and get about on public lands. The trekkers traveled on foot, horseback, mountain bikes, ATVs and off-road motorcycles, in canoes, whitewater rafts, motorboats and four wheel drive vehicles.

The teams met sixty days later on National Public Lands Day in the Uinta-Wasatch-Cache National Forest near Salt Lake City, Utah.

The Teams

The North Team left from the Canada–US border in Waterton-Glacier International Peace Park, Montana, and traveled south toward Salt Lake City, Utah.

The South Team left from the Mexico–US border west of Las Cruces, New Mexico, and traveled north to Salt Lake City, Utah.

Education
American Frontiers attempted to present a balanced view of America's public lands—their history and their uses—by engaging the two teams in special public land showcase events, round table discussions, back country classrooms and en route visits to schools and communities to learn about public land issues.  Trek updates were shown on the television show “National Geographic Today” and through daily postings by team members at the American Frontiers website.

Trek Events
Both Teams took part in educational events along their trek. These events were hosted by US Fish& Wildlife, US Forest Service, Bureau of Land Management, US Geological Survey, and others.

Some of the North Team trek events included a tour of the OCI Trona Mine near Green River, WY, attending a wild horse and burro adoption event in Jackson, WY, and paddling across Clark Canyon Reservoir in a dugout canoe, following the steps (or paddle strokes) of the Lewis and Clark Expedition.

Some of the South Team's events ranged from a Wilderness Roundtable discussion in Silver City, NM about the importance of the Gila Wilderness in the lives of surrounding communities, a discussion about ATV use in the Fishlake National Forest in Utah, and a presentation on Condor reintroduction in the Kaibab National Forest.

Lesson Plans and Educational Resources
Interpretive and educational materials, including a 45 minute slide show about the history of public lands and lesson plans to be used in the classroom, can be found at the American Frontiers website.

Geography Action! 2002
American Frontiers: A Public Lands Journey inspired the National Geographic Society's Geography Action! 2002 curriculum, aimed at teaching school-aged children the beauty and the benefits of America's public lands.

Sponsors

American Frontier's sponsors, including National Geographic Society, Coleman Company, Coca-Cola Company, American Honda, and the Bureau of Land Management show the range of interests, from education to camping or motorized sports, that this event appealed to. A complete list of sponsors can be found at the American Frontiers website.

References

External links
American Frontiers Website
Public Lands Interpretive Association
Report on the Journey by the U.S. Bureau of Land Management

United States public land law